Mehmet Fuat Köprülü (December 5, 1890 – June 28, 1966), also known as Köprülüzade Mehmed Fuad, was a highly influential Turkish sociologist, turkologist, scholar, Minister of Foreign Affairs and Deputy Prime Minister of the Republic of Turkey.  A descendant of the illustrious noble Albanian  Köprülü family, whose influence in shaping Ottoman history between 1656 and 1711 surpassed even that of the House of Osman, Fuat Köprülü was a key figure in the intersection of scholarship and politics in early 20th century Turkey.

Early life 
Fuat Köprülü was born in the city of Istanbul in 1890 as Köprülüzade Mehmed Fuad. His paternal grandfather, Ahmet Ziya Bey, was the former ambassador to Bucharest, and Ahmet Ziya Bey was son of the former head of the Imperial Chancery of State (Divan-i Humayun Beylikcisi), Köprülüzade Arif Bey. Köprülüzade Arif Bey descended from the Köprülüs of the 17th century, an exceptional dynasty of Grand Viziers whose reforms and conquests delayed the collapse of the Ottoman Empire. Fuat Köprülü was named after the first Grand Vizier of the Köprülü Era, Köprülü Mehmed Pasha.

Fuat Köprülü received his formal education at the Ayasofya Middle and Mercan High schools, both products of the Ottoman educational reforms of the 19th century. In 1905, while a student at Mercan High School and only 15 years old, the magazine Musavver Terakki published three poems by Fuat Köprülü. By the time he entered the Istanbul University School of Law at the age of 17, Fuat Köprülü already had an excellent command of French, Persian and Arabic. His first book, Hayat-i Fikriyye (The Intellectual Life), was published when he was 19 years old. After three years of study, Fuat Köprülü abandoned the School of Law because of the poor quality of instruction, saying that diploma was not worth the loss of time it would entail.

Career

The Making of a Nationalist Intellectual 

From 1910 to 1913, Fuat Köprülü taught Ottoman language and literature at various high schools in Istanbul, including the prestigious Galatasaray High School. Fuat Köprülü initially opposed the literary movement known as New Language, which sought to simplify the Turkish language, and wrote articles for the Servet-i Funun magazine using a literary style comprehensible only to the most learned of Ottoman intellectuals. Fuat Köprülü changed his writing style and politics during the Balkan Wars. On February 6, 1913, the day after the Bulgarian army attacked the Ottoman lines in the outskirts of Istanbul, Türk Yurdu magazine, a bastion of simplified Turkish prose and Turkish nationalism, published the first of many popular and patriotic essays by the 23-year-old Fuat Köprülü: “Hope and Determination" (Umit ve Azim), “Mourning Migration (Hicret Matemleri), "A Turk's Prayer (Türk’ün Duasi), and “Turkishness, Islamness, Ottomanness" (Türklük, İslamlık, Osmanlılık). From 1919 to 1920 he contributed to Büyük Mecmua, a supporter of Turkish independence war.

Toward the end of 1913, Fuat Köprülü published his seminal and widely lauded academic article, “The Method in Turkish Literary History (Türk Edebiyati Tarihinde Usul), in Bilgi Mecmuasi.  He argued that historians should not only research kings, viziers, commanders and scholars, but ordinary people as well. Fuat Köprülü believed that in addition to public and official records, historians should also study art, archeology, literature, language, folklore and oral traditions. His plea for historians to study social history was so unique and ahead of its time that the Annales school in France, famous for embracing a similar approach in the journal Annales d’histoire economique et sociale, did not emerge until 1929, a full 16 years after the publication of "Turk Edebiyati Tarihinde Usul". One month after the publication of the article, Fuat Köprülü was appointed Professor of the History of Turkish Literature at Istanbul University. He was only 23 years old.

Fuat Köprülü continued his scholarly research and academic publications through the years, eventually culminating in his magnum opus, The First Mystics in Turkish Literature (Turk Edebiyatinda İlk Mutasavviflar), in 1918, a book that focused on two Turkish mystics and folk poets, Ahmet Yesevi and Yunus Emre. His Turk Edebiyati Tarihi (History of Turkish Literature), published in 1920, was another seminal book that traced the history of Turkish literature through millennia. In 1923, at the age of 33, Fuat Köprülü was appointed Dean of the Faculty of Literature at Istanbul University. In a short book entitled The History of Turkey (Türkiye Tarihi) published that same year, he reviewed the history of the Turks from ancient Central Asia to the modern Ottoman Empire, continuing the approach he pioneered in his study of Turkish literature.

Relationship with Mustafa Kemal Atatürk
Fuat Köprülü was appointed undersecretary to the minister of education at the request of President Atatürk and remained in this post for eight months. In addition, Fuat Köprülü was appointed the director of the Turcology Institute, established on the orders of President Atatürk, and began publishing Turkiyat Mecmuasi (The Turcology Journal).

In 1936 Köprülü was appointed editor-in-chief of Ülkü, an official periodical of the Ankara People House, one of the cultural institutions established by Atatürk in 1932, which he held until 1941.

International Recognition 

Fuat Köprülü won numerous international accolades for his scholarship as well.  The Soviet Academy of Sciences granted him a corresponding membership in 1925.  The University of Heidelberg honored him with an honorary degree in 1927.  The University of Athens and the University of Paris (Sorbonne) granted him honorary doctorates in 1937 and 1939, respectively.  In fact, most European Oriental societies made him a corresponding or honorary member, as did the American Oriental Society in 1947.

In 1933, Fuat Köprülü became a professor ordinarius, a title denoting a professor of the highest rank in Turkey.  In 1935, he delivered a series of influential lectures at the University of Paris (Sorbonne) on the origins of the Ottoman Empire.  Fuat Köprülü argued that ethnic Turks formed the Ottoman Empire using Seljuk and Ilhanid administrative traditions, and he discredited the prevailing view among Western scholars that the Ottoman Empire was formed by a race of predominantly Albanian, Eastern Roman and Slavic converts to Islam.

Later Political Life 
In 1935, at the request of President Atatürk, Fuat Köprülü joined the single party regime in the Turkish Parliament as a Kars deputy, and was elected again in 1939 and 1943.  In 1945, as calls to establish a multiparty democracy increased after World War II, Fuat Köprülü joined the opposition and was dismissed from the ruling party along with Adnan Menderes and Refik Koraltan.  In 1946, Menderes, Koraltan and Köprülü, together with Celal Bayar, formed the Democratic Party.  Fuat Köprülü became the Minister of Foreign Affairs when the Democratic Party came to power in the 1950 elections, and he served in this post until 1955. In 1953, an agreement was reached between Yugoslav President Tito and Fuat Köprülü that promoted the emigration of Albanians from Yugoslavia to Anatolia. Concerning Cyprus, he had a tolerant view of the dispute and supported the line of the Turkish government, that the status quo of a British government on the island was favorable. Fuat Köprülü also briefly served as Deputy Prime Minister in 1955. On September 6, 1957, Fuat Köprülü resigned from the Democratic Party after disagreeing with the authoritarian tendencies displayed by the party leadership; same year he joined Liberty Party. Following the coup d'état in 1960 he was tried at the Yassıada trials but found not guilty.

Death 
Fuat Köprülü died on 28 June 1966.

Works
A prolific scholar and public intellectual, Fuat Köprülü wrote over 1500 poems, essays, articles and books.  A Mehmet Fuat Koprulu Scholarship Programme was recently established to provide funds for Turkish students to undertake PhD study at the University of Cambridge.  His works include the following:

Yeni Osmanlı Tarih-i Edebiyatı (1916)
Türk Edebiyatında İlk Mutasavvıflar (1918)
Nasrettin Hoca (1918)
Türk Edebiyatı Tarihi (1920)
Türkiye Tarihi (1923)
Bugünkü Edebiyat (1924)
Azeri Edebiyatına Ait Tetkikler (1926)
Milli Edebiyat Cereyanının İlk Mübeşşirleri ve Divan-ı Türk-i Basit (1928)
Türk Saz Şairleri Antolojisi (1930–1940, üç cilt)
Türk Dili ve Edebiyatı Hakkında Araştırmalar (1934)
Anadolu’da Türk Dili ve Edebiyatı’nın Tekamülüne Bir Bakış (1934)
Osmanlı Devleti’nin Kuruluşu (1959)
Edebiyat Araştırmaları Külliyatı (1966)
İslam ve Türk Hukuk Tarihi Araştırmaları ve Vakıf Müessesesi (1983)

Translations
The Origins of the Ottoman Empire, trans. Gary Leiser. SUNY Press, 1992.
The Seljuks of Anatolia: their history and culture according to local Muslim sources, trans. Gary Leiser. University of Utah Press, 1992.
Islam in Anatolia after the Turkish Invasion (Prolegomena), trans. Gary Leiser. University of Utah Press, 1993. 
Some Observations on the Influence of Byzantine Institutions on Ottoman Institutions, trans. Gary Leiser.  Türk Tarih Kurumu, 1999.
[https://books.google.com/books?id=_v6IWkCLnEwC Early Mystics in Turkish Literature], trans. by Gary Leiser and Robert Dankoff. Routledge, 2006.

References

External links
 

 
 

 
 

 
 

Turkish non-fiction writers
20th-century writers from the Ottoman Empire
Turkologists
20th-century Turkish historians
Ministers of National Defence of Turkey
Mehmet
Academic staff of Istanbul University
Ministers of Foreign Affairs of Turkey
Deputy Prime Ministers of Turkey
1890 births
1966 deaths
Istanbul High School alumni
Deputies of Istanbul
Members of the 19th government of Turkey
Members of the 20th government of Turkey
Members of the 21st government of Turkey
Members of the 22nd government of Turkey
Foreign Members of the USSR Academy of Sciences
Grand Crosses 1st class of the Order of Merit of the Federal Republic of Germany
20th-century non-fiction writers